Quasipaa boulengeri is a species of frog in the family Dicroglossidae. It is known under many common names, including Boulenger's spiny frog, spiny-bellied frog, and Boulenger's paa frog. It is found in southern and southwestern China and northern Vietnam. It is a very common species that has declined. It is collected for human consumption, and it is also threatened by habitat loss. Its natural habitats are hill streams and ponds.

References

Quasipaa
Amphibians of China
Amphibians of Vietnam
Taxonomy articles created by Polbot
Amphibians described in 1889
Taxa named by Albert Günther